Samadarshi Dutta is a Bengali film actor.

Career
Dutta is a Film and Television Institute of India graduate. In 2011 he debuted in acting with Shiboprosad Mukherjee and Nandita Roy's film.

Filmography

References

External links

Living people
Male actors in Bengali cinema
Film and Television Institute of India alumni
21st-century Indian male actors
Year of birth missing (living people)